James Randi Educational Foundation (JREF) is an American grant-making institution founded in 1996 by magician and skeptic James Randi. As a nonprofit organization, the mission of JREF includes educating the public and the media on the dangers of accepting unproven claims, and to support research into paranormal claims in controlled scientific experimental conditions. The organization announced its change to a grant-making foundation in September 2015.

The organization previously administered the One Million Dollar Paranormal Challenge, a prize of one million U.S. dollars to anyone who could demonstrate a supernatural or paranormal ability under agreed-upon scientific testing criteria. JREF also maintains a legal defense fund to assist persons who are attacked as a result of investigating or criticizing those making paranormal claims.

The organization has been funded through member contributions, grants, and conferences, though it ceased accepting memberships after 2015. For several years the JREF website published the blog Swift, which included news and information as well as exposés of paranormal claimants.

History 
The JREF officially came into existence on February 29, 1996, when it was registered as a nonprofit corporation in the State of Delaware in the United States. On April 3, 1996, Randi formally announced the creation of the JREF through his email hotline. It is now headquartered in Falls Church, Virginia.

Randi says Johnny Carson was a major sponsor, giving several six-figure donations.

The officers of the JREF are:
 Director, Secretary, Assistant Secretary: Richard L. Adams Jr., Ft. Lauderdale, Florida.
 Director, Secretary: Daniel Denman, Silver Spring, Maryland.

In 2008 the astronomer Philip Plait became the new president of the JREF and Randi its board chairman. In December 2009 Plait left the JREF due to involvement in a television project, and D.J. Grothe assumed the position of president on January 1, 2010, holding the position until his departure from the JREF was announced on September 1, 2014.

The San Francisco newspaper SF Weekly reported on August 24, 2009, that Randi's annual salary was about $200,000.  Randi resigned from JREF in 2015.

The One Million Dollar Paranormal Challenge 

In 1964, Randi began offering a prize of US$1,000 to anyone who could demonstrate a paranormal ability under agreed-upon testing conditions.  This prize has since been increased to US$1 million in bonds and is now administered by the JREF.  Since its inception, more than 1,000 people have applied to be tested.  To date, no one has been able to demonstrate their claimed abilities under the testing conditions, all applicants either failing to demonstrate the claimed ability during the test or deviating from the foundation conditions for taking the test such that any apparent success was held invalid; the prize money remains unclaimed.
However, in 2015 the James Randi Educational Foundation said they will no longer accept applications directly from people claiming to have a paranormal power, but will offer the challenge to anyone who has passed a preliminary test that meets with their approval.

The Amaz!ng Meeting   

From 2003 to 2015, the JREF annually hosted The Amaz!ng Meeting, a gathering of scientists, skeptics, and atheists. Perennial speakers include Richard Dawkins, Penn & Teller, Phil Plait, Michael Shermer and Adam Savage.

Podcasts and videos 
The foundation produced two audio podcasts, For Good Reason which was an interview program hosted by D.J. Grothe, promoting critical thinking and skepticism about the central beliefs of society. It has not been active since December 2011. Consequence was a biweekly podcast hosted by former outreach coordinator Brian Thompson in which regular people shared their personal narratives about the negative impact a belief in pseudoscience, superstition, and the paranormal had had on their lives. It has not been active since May, 2013.

The JREF also produced a regular video cast and YouTube show, The Randi Show, in which former JREF outreach coordinator Brian Thompson interviewed Randi on a variety of skeptical topics, often with lighthearted or comedic commentary. It has not been active since August 2012. In November 2015, Harriet Hall produced a series of ten lectures called Science Based Medicine for the JREF. The videos deal with various complementary alternative medicine subjects including homeopathy, chiropractic, acupuncture and more.

The JREF posted many of its educational videos from The Amaz!ng Meeting and other events online. There are lectures by Neil DeGrasse Tyson, Carol Tavris, Lawrence Krauss, live tests of the One Million Dollar Paranormal Challenge, workshops on cold reading by Ray Hyman, and panels featuring leading thinking on various topics related to JREF's educational mission on the JREF YouTube channel. JREF past president D.J. Grothe has claimed that the JREF's YouTube channel was once the "10th most subscribed nonprofit channel of all time", though its status in 2013 was 39th and most non-profits do not register for this status.

The foundation produced its own "Internet Audio Show" which ran from January–December 2002 and was broadcast via a live stream. The archive can be found as mp3 files on the JREF website and as a podcast on iTunes.

Forum and online community 

As part of the JREF's goal of educating the general population about science and reason, people involved in their community ran a popular skeptic based online forum with the overall goal of promoting "critical thinking and providing the public with the tools needed to reliably examine paranormal, supernatural, and pseudoscientific claims".

On October 5, 2014, this online forum was divorced from the JREF and moved as its own entity to International Skeptics Forum.

In 2007 the JREF announced it would resume awarding critical thinking scholarships to college students after a brief hiatus due to the lack of funding.

The JREF has also helped to support local grassroot efforts and outreach endeavors, such as SkeptiCamp, Camp Inquiry and various community-organized conferences. However, according to their tax filing, they spend less than $2,000 a year on other organizations or individuals.

JREF Award

The JREF award "is given to the person or organization that best represents the spirit of the foundation by encouraging critical questions and seeking unbiased, fact-based answers." Some of the recipients include the following:
 2017: Susan Gerbic
 2018: Jen Gunter
 2020: Sarah McAnulty
 2022: Kathleen Dyer and Raymond Hall

See also 

 An Encyclopedia of Claims, Frauds, and Hoaxes of the Occult and Supernatural (by Randi)
 Debunker
 List of prizes for evidence of the paranormal
 Pigasus Award
 Rationalist Prabir Ghosh increases his challenge amount to $50,000 against any claim of paranormal, after surviving nine assassination attempts.
 Skeptic's Dictionary by Robert Todd Carroll

References

Further reading

External links 

 
 International Skeptics Forum

1996 establishments in Delaware
Organizations established in 1996
Prizes for proof of paranormal phenomena
Skeptic organizations in the United States
501(c)(3) organizations
Non-profit organizations based in Virginia